Vlčtejn is a municipality and village in Plzeň-South District in the Plzeň Region of the Czech Republic. It has about 90 inhabitants.

Administrative parts
The village of Chlumánky is an administrative part of Vlčtejn.

References

Villages in Plzeň-South District